The 2012 Euroleague American Tour was a basketball exhibition tour featuring teams from the Euroleague and the NBA, as a part of the Euroleague American Tour. The hosting countries were the United States and Canada.

Participants

Games

See also
2009 Euroleague American Tour
2010 Euroleague American Tour

Related links
 List of games played between NBA and international teams

References

External links
Official Euroleague Website

EuroLeague American Tour
American
Euroleague
Euroleague